is a railway station in the city of Tsuruoka, Yamagata, Japan, operated by East Japan Railway Company (JR East).

Lines
Iragawa Station is served by the Uetsu Main Line, and is located  rail kilometers from the terminus of the line at Niitsu Station.

Station layout
Iragawa Station has a single island platform serving two tracks, connected to the small station building by an underground passage. The station is unattended.

Platforms

History
Iragawa Station opened on March 18, 1923. With the privatization of JNR on April 1, 1987, the station came under the control of JR East.

Surrounding area
Iragawa Post Office

See also
List of railway stations in Japan

References

External links
 JR East Station information 

Stations of East Japan Railway Company
Railway stations in Yamagata Prefecture
Uetsu Main Line
Railway stations in Japan opened in 1923
Tsuruoka, Yamagata